List of Guggenheim Fellowships awarded in 1933. Thirty-eight fellows were elected.

1933 U.S. and Canadian Fellows

1933 Latin American and Caribbean Fellows

See also
 Guggenheim Fellowship
 List of Guggenheim Fellowships awarded in 1932
 List of Guggenheim Fellowships awarded in 1934

References

1933
1933 awards